Bertel Broman (21 August 1889 – 11 May 1952) was a Finnish sailor who competed in the 1928 Summer Olympics.

References

1889 births
1952 deaths
Finnish male sailors (sport)
Olympic sailors of Finland
Sailors at the 1928 Summer Olympics – 12' Dinghy
Olympic bronze medalists for Finland
Olympic medalists in sailing
Medalists at the 1928 Summer Olympics